San Lorenzo is a municipality in the San Vicente department of El Salvador.

Sports
The local professional football club is named C.D. Atlético San Lorenzo and it currently plays in the Salvadoran Third Division.

Municipalities of the San Vicente Department